Shaughnessy may refer to:
 Shaughnessy, Alberta, a village in Canada
 Shaughnessy, Vancouver, a neighbourhood in Vancouver, British Columbia
 Shaughnessy Elementary School, a school in the Vancouver School Board school district in Vancouver, British Columbia, Canada
 Shaughnessy playoff system, a postseason tournament format

People with the surname
 Alfred James Shaughnessy (1916–2005), English scriptwriter and producer, also known as "Freddy Shaughnessy"
 Brenda Shaughnessy (born 1970), American poet
 Charles Shaughnessy (born 1955), English television, theatre and film actor
 Clark Shaughnessy (1892–1970), American Football coach
 Conor Shaughnessy (born 1996), Irish professional footballer
 Dan Shaughnessy (born 1953), American sports writer
 David Shaughnessy (born 1957), British voice-over actor
 Dawn Angela Shaughnessy, American radiochemist 
 Deb Shaughnessy (born 1960), American politician
 Edward L. Shaughnessy, expert on early Chinese history
 Edwin Thomas Shaughnessy (1929–2013), a swing music and jazz drummer 
 Elizabeth Shaughnessy (born 1937), Irish chess player and trainer
 Francis Shaughnessy (1911–1982), American ice hockey player 
 Frank Shaughnessy (1884–1969), minor league baseball official who invented a playoff system
 Gerald Shaughnessy (1887-1950), American Roman Catholic Church. He served as Bishop of Seattle
 Joseph Thomas Gordan Shaughnessy (born 1992), Irish professional defender
 Jonathan Shaughnessy, Canadian curator in the field of contemporary art
 Matt Shaughnessy (born 1986), American football player in the role of defensive end
 Meghann Shaughnessy (born 1979), American professional tennis player
 Michael O'Shaughnessy (1864–1934), Irish civil engineer 
 Mickey Shaughnessy (1920-1985), Irish American character actor and comedian
 Mina P. Shaughnessy (1924–1978), pioneering academic in the field of Basic Writing
 Patrick "Spark" Shaughnessy, President and CEO of AVI Communication
 Paul V. Shaughnessy, American politician 
 Peter Anthony "Pete" Shaughnessy (1962–2002), British mental health activist 
 Ryan O'Shaughnessy (born 1992), Irish singer-songwriter and former actor 
 Shaughnessy Bishop-Stall, Canadian journalist
 Shaughnessy Cohen (1948–1998), Canadian politician
 Steve O'Shaughnessy (footballer) (born 1967), Welsh professional manager of Airbus UK Broughton O'Shaughnessy or "Shaughssa"
 Thomas Michael O'Shaughnessy Jr. (born 1956), American member of the UCF Athletics Hall of Fame
 Thomas George Shaughnessy, 1st Baron Shaughnessy KCVO (1853–1923), American-born Canadian railway administrator 
 Tom Shaughnessy (1892–1938), American ice hockey player and coach
 William G. Shaughnessy, American politician 
 William O'Shaughnessy(1673–1744), Irish Chief and Major-General

See also
 O'Shaughnessy, a traditional Irish surname 
 Shaughnessy Cohen Award, writing award established in her memory
 Shaughnessy Village, a neighbourhood in Montreal, Quebec, Canada
 Mount Shaughnessy Tunnel, a railway tunnel located in British Columbia
 St. John's Shaughnessy, Anglican church in Vancouver